A Wife's Awakening is a 1921 American silent drama film directed by Louis J. Gasnier and starring William P. Carleton, Fritzi Brunette and Sam De Grasse.

Cast
 William P. Carleton as John Howard
 Fritzi Brunette as Florence Otis
 Sam De Grasse as George Otis
 Beverly Travers as Grace
 Edythe Chapman as Mrs. Kelcey

References

Bibliography
 Munden, Kenneth White. The American Film Institute Catalog of Motion Pictures Produced in the United States, Part 1. University of California Press, 1997.

External links
 

1920s American films
1921 films
1921 drama films
1920s English-language films
American silent feature films
Silent American drama films
American black-and-white films
Films directed by Louis J. Gasnier
Film Booking Offices of America films